Artem Pavlovich Torgashev (born January 1, 1969) is a former pair skater who competed internationally for the Soviet Union. With partner Ekaterina Murugova, he is a two-time World Junior medalist. He has a bachelor's degree in Physical Education from the Moscow State Institute of Physical Culture. Torgashev is married to former ice dancer Ilona Melnichenko, with whom he has two children, Andrew and Deanna. They coach at the Panthers Figure Skating Club, Panthers IceDen in Coral Springs, Florida. Their son, Andrew Torgashev, was born May 29, 2001 in Coral Springs, Florida and competes for the United States in single skating.

Results
(with Murugova)

References

Soviet male pair skaters
Living people
Figure skaters from Moscow
1969 births
World Junior Figure Skating Championships medalists
Russian emigrants to the United States